2020s in climate history refers to major events pertaining to the climate, this includes extreme weather, as well as new scientific phenomena and occurrences which pertain to the climate. This article will be structured by category of data, and then chronologically within those broader sections.

Overview of climate topics

This section summarizes and delineates the scope of topics included under the broad heading of "climate."

Natural events

2022

Europe

United Kingdom 

The 2022 United Kingdom heat wave was a period of unusually hot weather across much of the United Kingdom, reaching its expected peak with a heat wave from 17 to 20 July that reached temperatures of 40 degrees in parts of England on 19 July. It is part of the wider 2022 European heat waves. The Met Office released the first heat health warnings in response to rising temperatures on 8 July. On 15 July, it declared a national emergency as the UK's first red extreme heat weather warning was put in place for much of central and southern England.

The heat wave was unprecedented; the hottest temperature ever recorded in the UK was observed on 19 July 2022, exceeding  for the first time in British history and surpassing a previous record set in 2019.

The heat wave caused substantial disruptions to transportation and sparked wildfires in some parts of the country.

North America

Human activity
The 2021 United Nations Climate Change Conference, "COP26", was delayed for a year by the COVID-19 pandemic; it led to the Glasgow Climate Pact. Participating countries were expected to increase their pledged action towards climate change mitigation, as part of the conference's five-year 'ratchet mechanism'. China pledged to reach net zero carbon emissions by 2060, and India by 2070. Countries that include 85% of the world's forests pledged to end deforestation by 2030. However, fossil fuel industry representatives formed the largest bloc at the conference, and India and China secured the change of a coal phase-out pledge to a "phasing down" of coal. Protests against the conference were the largest in the UK since the protests against the Iraq War, with criticisms of the pledges lacking accountability and not sufficiently or urgently addressing the climate crisis.

References

2020s
Climate history
21st century in the environment